Thập Tháp Di-Đà Temple (Ten Towers of Amitābha Temple,  or ) is historic 17th-century temple in Bình Định Province in south central Vietnam.

Originally constructed in 1683 by Zen master Nguyên Thiều (1648 - 1728), it has been heritage listed as being of national cultural significance.

References 

Buddhist temples in Vietnam
Buildings and structures in Bình Định province